Closeness is an album of duets by bassist Charlie Haden recorded in 1976 and released on the Horizon label.

Reception 
The Allmusic review by Scott Yanow awarded the album 4½ stars, stating, "Recommended, particularly due to the Ornette and Jarrett collaborations".

Track listing
All compositions by Charlie Haden
 "Ellen David" - 9:11   
 "O.C." -  9:31   
 "For Turiya" -  12:26   
 "For a Free Portugal" - 7:55  
Recorded at Kendun Recorders in Burbank, California on January 26, 1976 (track 3) and at Generation Sound in New York City on March 18 (track 1) and March 21 (tracks 2 & 4), 1976

Personnel 
 Charlie Haden — bass
 Ornette Coleman — alto saxophone (track 2)
 Keith Jarrett — piano (track 1)
 Alice Coltrane — harp (track 3)
 Paul Motian — percussion (track 4)

References 

Horizon Records albums
Charlie Haden albums
1976 albums